The Old Man (Старик) is a 1915  by Maxim Gorky. Revised 1922, 1924, it has also been translated by Marie Zakrevsky and Barrett H. Clark The Judge (1925).

References

External links

1915 plays
Russian plays
Plays by Maxim Gorky